Thibault Marchal (born May 22, 1986 in Montmorency, Val-d'Oise) is a French professional football player, who currently plays for Clermont Foot.

Career
He played on the professional level in Ligue 2 for Clermont Foot.

Notes

1986 births
Living people
French footballers
Ligue 2 players
Clermont Foot players
Expatriate soccer players in Australia
USJA Carquefou players
Moulins Yzeure Foot players
Stade Bordelais (football) players
Association football forwards